Sarita Singh is an Indian politician, who is the incumbent president of Chhatra Yuva Sangharsh Samiti,( CYSS ) the student's wing of the Aam Aadmi Party (AAP). She was a member of the Sixth Legislative Assembly of Delhi and represented Rohtas Nagar (Assembly constituency) of Delhi. Singh is also a social worker.

Personal life and education
Sarita Singh is the daughter of Awadesh Kumar Singh. After completing her Master of Arts (M. A.) in Sociology from the Delhi University (DU), Sarita Singh focussed on social work. She was aged 28 years in February 2015. Singh is a resident of Ram nagar, which is part of the Rohtas Nagar assembly constituency she represents. She is a Purvanchali, belonging to the Purvanchal area, which comprises Eastern Uttar Pradesh and Bihar.

Political career
Sarita Singh is the president of Chhatra Yuva Sangharsh Samiti, the student's wing of the Aam Aadmi Party (AAP).

Singh was one of the six female M.L.A.s elected to Sixth Legislative Assembly of Delhi by winning the February 2015 Delhi Legislative Assembly elections. All of them were from the AAP. AAP won 67 of 70 seats in the assembly. Singh won from the Rohtas Nagar (Assembly constituency), securing 62,209 votes. She defeated the sitting M.L.A. Jitender Mahajan (Jitender Kumar) of the Bharatiya Janata Party (BJP) by a margin of 7,874 votes. Mahajan had defeated Mukesh Hooda of the AAP by a margin of more than 14,000 votes in the previous Delhi Legislative Assembly elections in 2013.

During the election campaign, Singh's car was attacked and damaged with iron rods and wooden clubs by a group of unidentified miscreants in North east Delhi, in the night while she was on the way home. The Hindu noted that she was fielded by the AAP to appease the large migrant population from Purvanchal.

Posts Held

See also

Sixth Legislative Assembly of Delhi
Aam Aadmi Party

References 

Controversy: Two voter I Card of AAP MLA

Aam Aadmi Party MLAs from Delhi
Living people
Delhi MLAs 2015–2020
Women members of the Delhi Legislative Assembly
Indian prisoners and detainees
21st-century Indian women politicians
21st-century Indian politicians
Indian women sociologists
Indian sociologists
Social workers
20th-century Indian educators
20th-century Indian women scientists
20th-century Indian social scientists
Social workers from Delhi
Women educators from Delhi
Educators from Delhi
Aam Aadmi Party candidates in the 2020 Delhi Legislative Assembly election
20th-century women educators
1981 births